Šahinovići may refer to:

 Šahinovići (Čelinac), a village in Bosnia and Herzegovina
 Šahinovići (Kiseljak), a village in Bosnia and Herzegovina